Tufan is a masculine Turkish given name and surname. In Turkish it means "violent rainstorm" or "flood". Notable people with the name include:

Given name
 Tufan Bahadur, Mughal soldier stationed in Bengal
 Tufan Ersöz, Turkish basketball player
 Tufan Esin, Turkish footballer 
 Semih Tufan Gülaltay, founder of the militant Turkish Revenge Brigade
 Tufan Kelleci, Turkish footballer
 Tufan Tosunoğlu, Turkish footballer

Surname
 Ozan Tufan, Turkish footballer

See also
 Tufan (disambiguation)

References

Turkish-language surnames
Turkish masculine given names